Eggleton may refer to:

 Eggleton, Herefordshire, civil parish in England
 Eggleton (surname), English surname
 Eggleton, West Virginia, unincorporated community in Putnam County, West Virginia

See also
 Eggleston
 Egleton